Dickinson P. Martin (June 29, 1927 – February 14, 1990) was an artist from Chicago who wrote and illustrated a number of books in and related to the Oz series.

Career
Martin was an active Oz fan, serving as The International Wizard of Oz Club as president, vice-president, director, and editor of its magazine, The Baum Bugle.

Martin illustrated Merry Go Round in Oz (1963), the 40th title in the regular Oz series. Martin's illustrations received positive notice in a review in the Chicago Tribune.

He was co-author of The Oz Scrapbook (1977).  A Library Journal review of The Oz Scrapbook called it "a superb production". 

He wrote and illustrated The Ozmapolitan of Oz (1986). 

He designed new opening titles for the 1990s home video rerelease of His Majesty, the Scarecrow of Oz.

Selected works 

 The Visitors from Oz (1960) as illustrator
Merry Go Round in Oz (1963) as illustrator
The Oz Scrapbook. Random, 1977.  as co-author
The Ozmapolitan of Oz (1986) as author

References

External links 

 

American illustrators
1927 births
1990 deaths
Oz (franchise)